Ruvu is a small town and ward (shehia) located in the Kibaha District of the Pwani Region in eastern Tanzania, west of Dar es Salaam.Kilongozi, Nelson et al. (November 2005) The Utilization of Indigenous Knowledge in Range Management and Forage Plants for Improving Livestock Productivity and Food Security in the Maasai and Barbaig Communities of KIBAHA, fao.org, Retrieved 21 July 2014 (report includes map showing location of Ruvu)  As of 2002, the ward population was 6,697.

Transport 

The town is served by a junction station on the Central Railway of Tanzania Railways Corporation.  From the junction, a branch proceeds cross-country to join the Tanga lineDistrict Council - Infrastructure, Pwani Regional Commissioner's Office (Pwani region website confirms location of junction station at Ruvu), Retrieved 21 July 2014)  near Mnyusi. The branch diverges on the west side of the town, and the link was opened in August 1963.

Namesakes 

There are two other towns in Tanzania with the same name.

See also 

 Railway stations in Tanzania

References 

Populated places in Pwani Region